Lime Crime is an American cosmetics brand that was founded and launched by Doe Deere. The brand is well known in the beauty community for its eccentric and colourful products, as well as the controversies surrounding Deere and the company. In addition, the brand was independently owned by Deere until its acquisition by Stacy Panagakis and the Tengram Capital Partners in 2018. Lime Crime is also certified as vegan and cruelty-free by both PETA and the Leaping Bunny. The brand is currently stocked at retailers such as ASOS, Revolve, Cult Beauty, Ulta and Bloomingdale's.


Launch 
In 2004, Doe Deere (previously Xenia Vorotova) initially launched Lime Crime as an original, handmade fashion line, which was exclusively sold from her eBay account. The brand was cofounded by her partner, Mark Dumbleton. Deere was 23 years old at the time of the launch. The original aesthetic of Lime Crime fashion was Lolita-inspired, presenting vibrant colours and abstract patterns. The official launch of Lime Crime Makeup was in October 2008, which featured a small collection of colourful glitters, loose pigments, brushes and blush. The original prices of these products ranged from US$12 to US$25.

Products 
As of May 2019, Lime Crime offers various cosmetic and beauty products, which are separated into the following categories on their website: Lips; Eyes; Face; Hair; Bundles; Accessories. The brand is reported to offer 24 shades of its hair dye and 102 makeup products.

Lip Products 
Their lip products include liquid cream lipsticks (“Lip Blaze”), matte lipsticks (“Plushies Soft Matte Lipstick”) and metallic lipsticks (“Velvetines Liquid Lipstick”), lip liners (“Velvetine Lip Liners”), lip glosses (“Wet Cherry Glosses”) and iridescent lip toppers (“Diamond Crushers”). Their lipsticks are either in a liquid lipstick tube with a doe foot applicator or the traditional lipstick tube (as seen on Lime Crime's diamond lipstick). The brand offers over 150 various colours and formulas of lip products.

Eye Products 
Lime Crime's eye range features various eyeshadow palettes (including the “Venus” grunge eye palettes), pocket-sized eyeshadows (called the “pocket candy”), as well as their “diamond dew” liquid eyeshadows. The company also sells pressed-pigment eyeshadow quads. These eyeshadows are one of the best-selling products on the Lime Crime website and feature matte, satin and metallic finishes.

Face Products 
According to the Lime Crime website, the company also offers soft matte blushes, glow blushes, and “Hi-Lite” highlighter palettes. These products are very reminiscent of the original intentions of Lime Crime due to their colourful hues, particularly as the “Hi-Lite” palettes are mermaid and unicorn themed.

Hair Products 
Lime Crime's hair range includes glitter and pastel hair colour sprays, full coverage hair dyes, colour tints, hair colour mixers, as well as sample dye packets. Their range of semi-permanent hair dyes has been praised for being one of the only vegan hair dye formulas in the market.

Bundles & Accessories 
Lime Crime offers various bundles for their hair colours, eyeshadows and lipsticks in an attempt to encourage their target market to purchase more products with a slightly discounted price. Moreover, the brand also offers accessories such as makeup brushes and makeup bags, which perpetuate the brand's unconventional image with the shimmer, vivid colours and holographic materials utilised in their makeup brushes and cosmetics bags.

Marketing 
Lime Crime utilises customer engagement, public relations and marketing strategies that revolve around creativity, individualism and uniqueness. Due to the fact that the brand could only be purchased online until recently, Lime Crime had to employ online marketing and develop a significant social media presence in order to highlight their products. Their products are positioned as tools for self-expression, especially as they encourage creativity through the consumer's creation of unique looks with their brightly-coloured products. On social media, the brand actively encourages fans to post photographs of their makeup looks that utilise Lime Crime products. The brand reposts these pictures in order to simultaneously support their customers and whilst inspiring other followers to purchase these products and use them creatively. Additionally, the brand's motto is “makeup for unicorns”, which emphasises how the company believes in cosmetics as a method of self-empowerment and creative expression.

Lime Crime have been heavily marketed according to their cruelty-free, vegan brand ethos. In 2018, there were rumours circulating that the company was interested in expanding the distribution of their products to China. This is not surprising considering the fact that in 2017, the retail sales in the nation's cosmetics sector equated to US$36.4 million, with sales continuing to increase at an exponential rate.  However, this expansion would be challenging to the ethos and image of the brand, as cosmetic products manufactured from foreign companies are required by law to undergo animal testing in order to sell in China. In order to retain the company's cruelty-free and vegan nature, Lime Crime sold their products through Revolve, who were able to ship to China directly from the United States of America and avoid the animal testing law.  As a result of this, the previous Global General Manager of Lime Crime, Kim Walls, has stated that this method of sales in China has eliminated approximately 1,700 monthly listings from counterfeit e-retailers. Moreover, this has led to the confiscation and destruction of over US$2 million in product value in counterfeit goods from the previous year.

Operations 
Lime Crime was originally founded as an independent company by Doe Deere and her husband, Mark Dumbleton, in 2008. However, in 2018, the brand was purchased by Tengram Capital Partners, a private equity firm that aimed to develop Lime Crime as a conventional and commercially acceptable brand. Due to Tengram's acquisition of Lime Crime, Stacy Panagakis would replace Doe Deere as the Chief Executive Officer. The brand's shift from an independently owned brand to a company that is supported by corporate funding would allow the brand to expand its market offerings and product distributions. Thus, Deere has joined the brand's board of directors and stepped down from the daily operations.  Furthermore, Sasha Valentine, a long-time employee and Chief Creative Officer of Lime Crime, would continue to collaborate with Panagakis to succeed its growth prospects. In June, 2018, it was confirmed by a representative from Lime Crime that Kim Walls, the brand's Global General Manager had departed from the company.

Controversy

Legal action against online critics 
Lime Crime has threatened legal action against various influential bloggers who have given criticism to the brand and its products. These criticisms mostly revolved around the issue of repackaging wholesale pigments for a greater markup and the lack of transparency that Lime Crime provided to their customers regarding this issue. Due to this repackaging issue, many bloggers publicised the inconsistencies in product formulas, particularly in the colours and formulas of lipsticks, which were the same shade name.

A beauty blogger identified as Le Gothique claimed that she was legally warned by Lime Crime in 2009.  She claimed that the brand insisted that she delete her negative review of her Lime Crime products and instead post their provided apology verbatim.  A similar incident occurred in 2014, when Lime Crime sued blogger, Michelle Jascynski on the basis of defamation of character and copyright infringement. Jascynski operated a blog entitled “Doe Deere Lies”, which was dedicated to exposing Lime Crime's alleged wrongdoings by providing evidence. This lawsuit totalled approximately US$250,000, but was later dismissed as it had no legal grounds. In addition to this, there are many unconfirmed claims from beauty influencers and bloggers that have stated that Lime Crime had sent them cease and desist letters. The brand has also been known for deleting critical or negative comments from their social media pages until late 2014, in an attempt to maintain their brand image.

"China Doll" palette and cultural appropriation 
Lime Crime released a five-pan palette in early 2012, which sparked backlash from the makeup community due to its cultural appropriation of Chinese culture. The “China Doll” palette sparked outrage through both the product itself as well as the advertising campaign, which showcased a caucasian model in a Japanese kimono whilst interchangeably exploiting an aesthetic based on 1920's Chinese women. This perpetuated the stereotype of the ‘Lotus Blossom’ and orientalism. This cultural stereotype was further reiterated through the description of the palette:“Don't let her milky skin, pouty mouth and flushed cheeks fool you, underneath the poised facade, there lies a heart of a tigress”.Soon after this controversy arose, Lime Crime's founder, Doe Deere, issued an apathetic apology and justification of the "China Doll" advertising campaign on her blog. Nevertheless, many members of the beauty community were left feeling unfulfilled by Deere's apology, claiming that it was still culturally insensitive and ignorant as she made limited efforts to adjust the product and campaign.

The Lime Crime Boycott at IMATS 
Despite Lime Crime's shift in target markets, there has not been a shift in the brand's ethics. The brand began to target younger audiences as many members of YouTube's ‘beauty guru’ community, such as Jeffree Star, publicised their dislike for the brand. This is considered one of the main reasons as to why Lime Crime began to decline in popularity. After many years of attending the International Make-Up Artists Trade Show in Los Angeles (IMATS LA), a renowned beauty and cosmetics convention, the brand failed to show in 2014. Members of the online beauty community believed that this was a consequence of a petition that was established to boycott the brand at IMATS NYC (International Make-Up Artists Trade Show in New York City). This petition garnered approximately 12,600 signatures out of the goal of 20,000 signatures.

Lime Crime's Cyber Security Leak 
On 15 February 2015, Lime Crime reported on their Instagram account that their website had been infiltrated by credit card hackers. This security breach was active from 4 October 2014, to the date of the Instagram announcement, supposedly exposing customer data such as names, credit card details and addresses. However, many patrons of the site claimed that Lime Crime was responsible and that they dishonestly handled this credit card leak. Some claimed that the company had knowingly been using an expired SSL certificate in order to secure and store customers’ credit card information. Furthermore, the plaintiffs claimed that Lime Crime had been aware of these security breaches since November 2014, but have concealed this knowledge from consumers by ignoring early customer reports of the issue. The customer information that was exposed was further utilised to make international purchases for months. Although the majority of the victims lost approximately $200–300 USD through unauthorised international purchases, some customers reported fraud of up to US$10,000.

In December, 2017, Lime Crime faced continuous negotiations between counsel and mediation sessions with a retired judge before agreeing to a $110,000 class action settlement. This funding was to be allocated among qualifying Class Members who submitted timely and legitimate claims. The potential award for these Class Members was a payment of up to $44 as well as entitlement to a fifteen-percent discount off future purchases from Lime Crime makeup.  This discount was redeemed through a coupon code, which was sent to each class member, and was valid for approximately one year. The victims of this cyber security leak responded negatively to this compensation as they no longer wanted to support the brand and its products.

FDA Scandal 
On 29 July 2015, the U.S. Food and Drug Administration (FDA) reviewed the Velvetines Liquid Matte Lipsticks and issued an official warning letter for the shade “red velvet.”  This letter stated that Lime Crime's use of ferric ferrocyanide and ultramarines in the formula of this particular lip stain violates the Federal Food, Drug, and Cosmetic Act.  Lime Crime's social media pages articulated that this violation was because of a misprint on the product's packaging. Megan McSeveney, an FDA press officer, claims that the FDA investigation was launched as a result of receiving six complaints from consumers within a period of two months. The majority of those who complained were ignored by the brand or were simply blocked on social media platforms, such as Instagram and Twitter. Similarly to the security breach scandal, Lime Crime failed to email consumers when the FDA warning letter was released – addressing the issue through individual Instagram comments rather than by publishing a public declaration immediately. In November, 2015, Lime Crime published a FDA close-out letter on their website, which verified their corrections to the mislabelling on their product packaging.

References

External links
 Lime Crime official website

Cosmetics brands
Cosmetics companies of Japan
Cosmetics companies of the United States
Companies based in Los Angeles